Marquette Area Public Schools is a public school district serving the area of Marquette, Michigan, in the state's Upper Peninsula. The current superintendent is William Saunders.

Schools

High school (9-12)

Middle school (6-8)

Elementary schools (PreK-5)

Closed elementary schools

References

External links 
 Marquette Area Public Schools Official Website

School districts in Michigan
Education in Marquette County, Michigan